Muskeg Lake 102 is an Indian reserve of the Muskeg Lake Cree Nation in Saskatchewan. It is 93 kilometres north of Saskatoon. In the 2016 Canadian Census, it recorded a population of 274 living in 104 of its 112 total private dwellings. In the same year, its Community Well-Being index was calculated at 57 of 100, compared to 58.4 for the average First Nations community and 77.5 for the average non-Indigenous community.

References

Indian reserves in Saskatchewan